Patricia Quinn, Lady Stephens (born 28 May 1944) is an actress and singer from Northern Ireland. She is best known for her role as Magenta in the 1975 film The Rocky Horror Picture Show, and the original stage play from which it was adapted. She appeared as Dr. Nation McKinley in the 1981 film Shock Treatment. In 2012, Quinn played the role of Megan in The Lords of Salem.

Early life 
Quinn was born in Belfast, Northern Ireland, to James Connolly Quinn, a bookmaker, and his wife Rebecca. She attended the Princess Gardens Grammar School, where she developed an early talent for acting. Following stints at Belfast's Arts Theatre and British Drama League, she left for London aged 17. In 1969, she trained at the Drama Centre London while simultaneously working as a blackjack-dealing Bunny at the Playboy Club in Mayfair. In 1971, she was in repertory for six months with the Citizens Theatre in Glasgow.

Career 
Quinn is known primarily for her role as Magenta in The Rocky Horror Picture Show (1975). In the film's opening title sequence, the movements of her disembodied lips are synchronised with the lyrics of the title song, "Science Fiction/Double Feature" (the singing voice is that of scriptwriter and actor Richard O'Brien).

She played Elizabeth Siddal in the 1975 mini series The Love School. In I, Claudius (1976), she took the role of the Emperor Claudius' sister Livilla. She also played Isla in The Professionals episode "Look After Annie" in 1978. Her other film and TV roles include the semi-sequel to The Rocky Horror Picture Show, Shock Treatment. She played "Woman" in Hawk the Slayer (1980). She appeared in the Hammer House of Horror episode "Witching Time" as Lucinda Jessop (1981), Monty Python's The Meaning of Life (1983), and the 1987 Doctor Who serial Dragonfire. Her latest film credit is Rob Zombie's The Lords of Salem (2012).

In 2000, Quinn recorded the song "Guts To Dream" with London-based band The Grand. The song was due to form part of an EP titled Open Displays of Affection, but the group had disbanded before it was released. Quinn gave a copy of the unreleased CD to the winner of a Magenta costume contest at the Rocky Horror Picture Show 25th Anniversary Convention in Las Vegas.

In 2002, she returned to Doctor Who, playing an alien queen in the audio play Bang-Bang-a-Boom!. In September 2006, she re-launched her career as a DJ and club kitten, hosting the monthly "Club Myra" night at various venues in Central London. In April 2007, she joined Patrick Wolf at a concert in London, singing "Accident and Emergency".

In October 2008, Quinn made a guest appearance in a production of The Rocky Horror Picture Show in New York City, participating in a question-and-answer session as well as unexpectedly performing "Science Fiction/Double Feature". She attended a Rocky Horror Picture Show convention in Atlantic City, New Jersey in July 2011, answering questions as well as introducing a performance of the show, staged at the House of Blues.

In May 2013, she served as the honorary Master of Ceremonies for a Rocky Horror Picture Show performance at the Dallas based Texas Frightmare Weekend horror convention. That same month, she was the guest of honor at a "40th Anniversary Tribute Concert" to the original Rocky Horror Show stage production, hosted at the Victoria Theatre in San Francisco, California by local drag celebrity Peaches Christ. During the tribute conference, Quinn performed "Science Fiction/Double Feature", answered questions on stage with Christ, and signed autographs for the audience.

Personal life
Quinn has a son, Quinn Hawkins, from her first marriage, to Don Hawkins. Her nephews, Jonny Quinn and Bradley Quinn, are members of the alternative rock band Snow Patrol.

In January 1995, Quinn married the actor Sir Robert Stephens, who died in November that year. Quinn thus became the stepmother of Toby Stephens and Chris Larkin, Stephens' two actor sons from his previous marriage to Maggie Smith. Quinn had previously appeared alongside Sir Robert in the BBC TV adaptation of The Box of Delights (1984) in the role of Sylvia Daisy Pouncer, and had played his on-screen wife in the serial Fortunes of War (1987). The elder Stephens had been knighted prior to his death, giving Quinn the title of Lady Stephens.

Filmography

Film

Television

References

External links

Patricia Quinn as Livilla in I, Claudius
Interview
 

1944 births
20th-century British actresses
20th-century women singers from Northern Ireland
21st-century British actresses
21st-century women singers from Northern Ireland
British voice actresses
Film actresses from Northern Ireland
Living people
Musicians from Belfast
Stage actresses from Northern Ireland
Television actresses from Northern Ireland
Wives of knights